Aechmea araneosa is a plant species of the genus Aechmea. This species is endemic to the State of Espírito Santo in Brazil. The plant ranges from 0-2 feet tall and 0-2 feet wide.

Cultivars
 Aechmea 'Festival'
 Aechmea 'Orange Sunrise'

References

BSI Cultivar Registry Retrieved 11 October 2009

araneosa
Flora of Brazil
Plants described in 1941